Jan Białas (18 August 1952 – 6 April 1975) was a Polish footballer. He played in one match for the Poland national football team in 1974.

References

External links
 

1952 births
1975 deaths
Polish footballers
Poland international footballers
People from Siemianowice Śląskie
Association football midfielders
Szombierki Bytom players
GKS Tychy players